This article describes the grammar of the Scottish Gaelic language.

Grammar overview

Gaelic shares with other Celtic languages a number of interesting typological features:
 Verb–subject–object basic word order in simple sentences with non-periphrastic verbal constructions, a typological characteristic relatively uncommon among the world's languages.
 conjugated prepositions (traditionally called "prepositional pronouns"): complex forms historically derived from the fusion of a preposition + pronoun sequence (see Prepositions below)
 prepositional constructions for expressing possession and ownership (instead of a verb like English have):
Tha taigh agam — "I have a house" (lit. "A house is at me")
Tha an cat sin le Iain – "Iain owns that cat" (lit. "Is the cat that with Ian")
 emphatic pronouns: Emphatic forms are systematically available in all pronominal constructions (See Pronouns below).
Tha cat agadsa ach tha cù agamsa – "You have a cat but I have a dog"

Consonant mutations

Lenition and slenderisation (also referred to as palatalisation or "i-infection") play a crucial role in Scottish Gaelic grammar.

Lenition (sometimes inaccurately referred to as "aspiration"), as a grammatical process, affects the pronunciation of initial consonants, and is indicated orthographically by the addition of an h:
caileag → chaileag "girl"
beag → bheag "small"
faca → fhaca "saw"
snog → shnog "nice"
Lenition is not indicated in writing for words beginning with l, n or r. Nor does it affect words that begin with either a vowel, or with sg, sm, sp, or  st. In most cases, lenition is caused by the presence of particular trigger words to the left (certain determiners, adverbs, prepositions, and other function words). In this article, the leniting effect of such words is indicated, where relevant, by the superscript "+L" (e.g. glè+L "very").

Slenderisation, on the other hand, is a change in the pronunciation of the final consonant of a word, and it is typically indicated by the addition of an i:
facal → facail "word"
balach → balaich "boy"
òran → òrain "song"
ùrlar → ùrlair "floor"
In many cases slenderisation accompanies more complex changes to the final syllable of the word:
cailleach → caillich "old woman"
ceòl → ciùil "music"
fiadh → fèidh "deer"
cas → cois "foot"
Slenderisation has no effect on words that end in a vowel (e.g. bàta "boat"), or words whose final consonant is already slender (e.g. sràid "street").

Most cases of slenderisation can be explained historically as the palatalizing influence of a following front vowel (such as -i) in earlier stages of the language. Although this vowel has now disappeared, its effects on the preceding consonant are still preserved. Similarly, lenition of initial consonants was originally triggered by the final vowel of the preceding word, but in many cases, this vowel is no longer present in the modern language.

Many word-final consonants have also disappeared in the evolution of Scottish Gaelic, and some traces of them can be observed in the form of prosthetic or linking consonants (n-, h-, t-, etc.) that appear in some syntactic combinations, for example, after some determiners (see below).

Nouns

Gender and number

Gaelic nouns and pronouns belong to one of two grammatical genders: masculine or feminine. Nouns with neuter gender in Old Gaelic were redistributed between the masculine and feminine.

The gender of a small number of nouns differs between dialects. A very small group of nouns have declensional patterns that suggest mixed gender characteristics. Foreign nouns that are fairly recent loans arguably fall into a third gender class (discussed by Black), if considered in terms of their declensional pattern. It is arguable that feminine gender is under pressure and that the system may be becoming simplified with the feminine paradigms incorporating some typically masculine patterns.

Nouns have three grammatical numbers: singular, dual (vestigially) and plural. Dual forms of nouns are only found after the numeral dà (two), where they are obligatory. The dual form is identical in form to the dative singular; depending on noun class, the dual is therefore either the same in form as the common singular (the nominative-accusative, Class 1 nouns, Class 3 and Class 4 nouns), or have a palatalised final consonant in nouns of Class 2 and Class 5. Plurals are formed in a variety of ways, including suffixation (often involving the suffix -(e)an) and slenderisation. Pluralisation, as in Irish Gaelic and Manx, can vary according to noun class, however on the whole depends on the final sound of the singular form.

Cardinal Numerals
For counting, or with numerals that are not followed by a noun, the form is slightly different.

Cases

Nouns and pronouns in Gaelic have four cases: nominative, vocative, genitive, and dative (or prepositional) case. There is no distinct accusative case form; the nominative is used for both subjects and objects. Nouns can be classified into a number of major declension classes, with a small number of nouns falling into minor patterns or irregular paradigms. Case forms can be related to the base form by suffixation, lenition, slenderisation, or a combination of such changes. See the example paradigms below for further details.

The case system is now under tremendous pressure and speakers exhibit varying degrees of paradigm simplification.

Prepositional or dative
Nouns in the dative case only occur after a preposition, and never, for example, as the indirect object of a verb.

Vocative
Nouns in the vocative case are introduced by the particle a+L, which lenites a following consonant, and is elided (and usually not written) before a vowel. The vocative form of feminine singular nouns is otherwise identical to the nominative; additionally, masculine singular nouns are slenderised in the vocative.
 feminine:
Màiri → a Mhàiri
Anna → (a) Anna
 masculine:
Seumas → a Sheumais
Aonghas → (a) Aonghais

Genitive
In the genitive construction, the genitive follows the word it governs: taigh m' athar house my father (genitive) "my father's house".

Indefinite and definite
Gaelic has no indefinite article. Cù may mean either "dog" or "a dog", and coin may mean either "dogs" or "some dogs."

The definite article is discussed below in full under articles. A noun or noun phrase is considered to be definite if it fulfils one of the following criteria.
 It is a proper noun
Màiri "Mary"
 Inbhir Nis "Inverness"
Alba "Scotland"
 It is preceded by an article
an cù "the dog"
na h-aibhnichean "the rivers"
 It is preceded by a possessive determiner
mo cheann "my head"
àirde mo chinn "at the top of my voice"

Pronouns

Personal pronouns
Gaelic has singular and plural personal pronouns (i.e., no dual forms). Gender is distinguished only in the 3rd person singular. A T-V distinction is found in the 2nd person, with the plural form sibh used also as a polite singular.

In most cases the Classical Gaelic lenited form of tu, i.e. thu, has become generalised. Tu is retained in constructions where it is preceded by a verb ending in -n -s or -dh (incl. historic -dh):

Is tu a rinn a' mhocheirigh! "You are an early riser!" 
Bu tu an gaisgeach! "What a hero you were!" (In older Gaelic bu was written and pronounced budh)
Mun abradh tu “deas-dé.” "Before you had time to say even a single word."
Cuiridh tu an-seo e! "You will put it here!"

Emphatic personal pronouns
The emphatic pronouns are used to express emphasis or contrast:
Tha i bòidheach — "She's beautiful"
Tha ise bòidheach — "Shes beautiful (as opposed to somebody else)"

Emphatic forms are found in all pronominal constructions:
an taigh aicese — "her house"
chuirinn-sa — "I would put"
na mo bheachd-sa — "in my opinion"

Adjectives

Adjectives in Gaelic inflect according to gender and case in the singular. In the plural, a single form is used for both masculine and feminine genders, in all cases (although it may be lenited depending on the context).

Adjectives normally follow the noun they modify, and agree with it in gender, number and case. In addition, in the dative singular of masculine nouns, the leniting effect of a preceding definite article (see Articles below) can be seen on both the noun and the following adjective:
 (air) breac mòr – "(on) a big trout"
 (air) a' bhreac mhòr – "(on) the big trout"

A small number of adjectives precede the noun, and generally cause lenition. For example:
 seann chù – "old dog"
 droch shìde – "bad weather"
 deagh thidsear – "good teacher"

Determiners

Possessive determiners

Gaelic uses possessive determiners (corresponding to my, your, their, etc.) differently from English. In Gaelic, possessive determiners are used mostly to indicate inalienable possession, for example for body parts or family members.

As indicated in the following table, some possessive determiners lenite the following word. Before a word beginning with a vowel, some of the determiners have elided forms, or require a linking consonant.

The 3rd plural possessive an takes the form am before words beginning with a labial consonant: b, p, f, or m.

As discussed above, the linking consonants n- and h- reflect the presence of a final consonant that has disappeared in other contexts. Ar and ur are derived from genitive plural forms that originally ended in a nasal.
The feminine singular a derives from a form ending in final -s, whose only trace is now the prefixation of h- to a following vowel.

To refer to non-permanent possession, one uses the preposition aig, as described above:
am faclair aice – her dictionary (lit. the dictionary at her)
an leabhar aca – their book (lit. the book at them)

Emphatic suffixes with possessive determiners 
Emphatic suffixes are used with possessive determiners, and other parts of speech, to lend emphatic or contrastive power. They are used following nouns preceded by possessive pronouns to emphasize the pronominal element. Notice that -sa replaces -se in the first person singular in comparison to the pronominal emphatic suffixes above.

Articles
Gaelic has a definite article but no indefinite article:
an taigh — the house, taigh — (a) house

The singular article is often used to designate an entire class.
 am bradan — "salmon"
 an t-each — "horses"
 am feur — "grass"

Abstract nouns consistently take the singular article, as well.
 an aois — "age"
 an sgìos — "tiredness"
 am blàs — "warmth"

The form of the (definite) article depends on the number, gender, case of the noun. The following table shows the basic paradigm, as used when there is no assimilation to the initial sounds of the following word.

The superscript "+L" indicates that the following word is lenited. The actual realization of the capitalised forms in the paradigm above depends on the initial sound of the following word, as explained in the following tables:

Putting all of those variants together into one table:

The forms of the definite article trace back to a Common Celtic stem *sindo-, sindā-. The initial s, already lost in the Old Irish period, is still preserved in the forms of some prepositions (for example le "with" becomes leis before an article, similarly (ann) an, "in", becomes anns — see below). The original d can be seen in the form an t-, and the leniting effect of the form an+L is a trace of a lost final vowel. The form na h- reflects an original final -s.

Example paradigms

The following examples illustrate a number of nominal declension patterns, and show how the definite article combines with different kinds of nouns.

Masculine definite noun paradigms

Feminine definite noun paradigms

Verbs

Verbal constructions may make use of synthetic verb forms which are marked to indicate person (the number of such forms is limited), tense, mood, and voice (active, impersonal/passive). Gaelic has very few irregular verbs, conjugational paradigms being remarkably consistent for two verb classes, with the two copular or "be" verbs being the most irregular. In the paradigm of the verb, the majority of verb-forms are not person-marked and independent pronouns are required as in English, Norwegian and other languages. Alongside constructions involving synthetic verb forms, analytic (or 'periphrastic') aspectual constructions are extremely frequently used and in many cases are obligatory (compare English "be + -ing" and Spanish "estar + -Vndo" verbal constructions). These structures convey tense, aspect and modality, often in fused forms.

'Verbal nouns' play a crucial role in the verbal system, being used in periphrastic verbal constructions preceded by a preposition where they act as the sense verb, and a stative verb conveys tense, aspect and mood information, in a pattern that is familiar from other Indo-European languages. Verbal nouns are true nouns in morphology and inherent properties, having gender, case and their occurrence in what are prepositional phrases, and in which non-verbal nouns are also found. Verbal nouns carry verbal semantic and syntactic force in such core verbal constructions as a result of their meaning content, as do other nouns found in such constructions, such as tha e na thost "he is quiet, he stays silent", literally "he is in his silence", which mirrors the stative usage found in tha e na shuidhe "he is sitting, he sits", literally "he is in his sitting". This is similar to words such as "bed" in English and "letto" in Italian when used in prepositional phrases such as "in bed" and "a letto" "in bed", where "bed" and "letto" express a stative meaning. The verbal noun covers many of the same notions as infinitives, gerunds and present participles in other Indo-European languages.

Traditional grammars use the terms 'past', 'future tense', 'conditional', 'imperative' and 'subjunctive' in describing the five core Scottish Gaelic verb forms; however, modern scholarly linguistic texts reject such terms borrowed from traditional grammar descriptions based on the concepts of Latin grammar. In a general sense, the verb system is similar to that found in Irish, the major difference being the loss of the simple present, this being replaced by the periphrastic forms noted above. These periphrastic forms in Irish have retained their use of showing continuous aspect. The tense–aspect system of Gaelic is ill-studied; Macaulay (1992) gives a reasonably comprehensive account.

Copula verbs
The number of copular verbs and their exact function in Gaelic is a topic of contention among researchers. There is a certain amount of variation in sources, making it difficult to come to a definitive conclusion about certain aspects of copular verbs. However, there is some information that consistently shows up across these sources, which we will discuss in this section.

Gaelic has two copular "be" verbs, though some grammar books treat them as two parts of a single suppletive verb:

Bi: attributes a property to a noun or pronoun; its complement is typically a description that expresses position, state, non-permanent characteristic (see further below)

Is: Historically called the “copula” verb, is can be used in constructions with nominal complements and adjectival complements. It also has the additional function of “topicalization”, a term that means a certain element of a sentence is being emphasized as the topic of interest.

Is:

In English, italics (for text) and stress (for speech) are used to emphasize different elements of a sentence; one can also change the word order to put the emphasized element first. Scottish Gaelic, however, does not use stress and very rarely uses word order changes to create emphasis. Instead, it uses topicalization, for example when “a sentence with the verb is followed by the element topicalised” (MacAulay, 189). This equates the English fronting device "it is X that ...":

Examples (from MacAulay, pages 189–190):

The fronting use of is is part of its general function of ascribing descriptions to a complement (see below). Most commonly one will see classificatory or adjectival complements, as shown below:

Bi:

Historically called the “substantive” verb, tha (the present indicative independent 3rd person singular form of bi) can be used in constructions with adjectival complements, locative predicates, and in aspectually marked sentences (MacAulay, page 180).

Examples (MacAulay, page 178):

It is also possible to use tha to describe a noun or pronoun with a nominal complement by using an embedded pronoun (MacAulay, page 179):

The two usages carry a semantic contrast. Is shows a permanent state, while tha shows that the state of being a soldier is temporary in some way or other. Often the tha construction is used when someone has just become a soldier, for example, while the is construction shows that being a soldier is a part of Ian's persona.

Notice that the example using is exhibits a diversion from the typical VSO word order. In Classical Gaelic, is incorporates the subject (3rd person singular), the noun or adjective that follows is in the nominative, and the second noun/pronoun is objective in case. In Modern Gaelic, this has been reanalysed as V – Topic/Complement – S, or V – S – S, a "double nominative construction", as it were. Latin based descriptions, however, assume the first analysis. The tha example maintains VSO/VSC word order, where the complement is a prepositional phrase that states what state the subject is in (in the state of being a soldier); cf. tha e na shuidhe and tha e na thost above.

The difference between tha and is is that tha describes psychologically temporary states:
 tha mi sgìth – "I am tired"
 tha an duine reamhair – "the man is fat"

Is, on the other hand, describes more permanent conditions — that is, states of being that are intrinsic and/or not seen as having an assumed end:
 is beag an taigh e – "it's a small house"
 is Albannach mi – "I am Scottish"

In the last example, for instance, if someone were to become a Scottish citizen, the phrase would be Tha mi nam Albannach a-nise "I am Scottish now".

Verb forms, tense and aspect

Tense and aspect are marked in Gaelic in a number of ways.

Present tense is formed by use of the verb "tha" and the verbal noun (or participle) form of the main verb. The construction, unlike Irish Gaelic, is neutral to aspect. Apart from this, tense and aspect marking are very similar in the two languages.

Tha mi a' bruidhinn. – "I am speaking" or "I speak" (lit. "Am I at speaking")

The perfective past in regular verbs is indicated by lenition of the initial consonant, and d'/dh' addition with verbs that start with a vowel or "f" (do is the underlying form in all cases):

bruidhinn  "speak" : bhruidhinn mi  "I spoke"
òl  "drink" : dh'òl mi  "I drank"
fuirich  "wait, stay" : dh'fhuirich mi  "I waited/stayed"

Gaelic conjugates verbs to indicate either the present imperfective or the future tense:

bruidhnnidh mi – "I speak", "I will speak", "I speak (at times/occasionally/often)".

The habitual continuous and future continuous is expressed by using the habitual verb bi:

Bidh mi a' bruidhinn – "I speak (regularly)", "I will be speaking", "I am speaking as a normal habit", etc.

As in other Celtic languages, Scottish Gaelic expresses modality and psych-verbals (such as "like", "prefer", "be able to", "manage to", "must"/"have to", "make"="compel to") by periphrastic constructions involving various adjectives, prepositional phrases and the copula or another verb, some of which involve highly unusual syntactic patterns when compared to English.

Prepositions and similar words
Prepositions in Gaelic govern either the nominative, dative (prepositional), or genitive case.

with dative:
air "on"
aig "at"
anns/ann an "in"
le(is) "with"
ri(s) "to"
with nominative:
The following originally governed a noun in the accusative; in modern Scottish Gaelic, the accusative has merged with other cases, usually the nominative or dative.
eadar "between"
gu(s) "until"
mar "as"
gun "without" 
with genitive:
tarsainn "across"
ré "during"
chun "towards"
trìd "through"
timcheall "around" 
The derivation of these is from the following nouns:
tarsainn is the bottom of the doorway.
ré is "time period".
chun is from older do chum "for (the) purpose, reason".
trìd is a nominalisation of the Classical Gaelic preposition trí "through" (in Gaelic now pronounced and written tro among other variants).
timcheall 'surroundings'.

All so-called "compound prepositions" consist of a simple preposition and a noun, and therefore the word they refer to is in the genitive case:

 ri taobh a' bhalaich – "beside the boy" (lit. "by the boy's side")

Some prepositions have different forms (ending in -s or -n) when followed by the article. In the case of -s, this is from the original initial s- of the definite article (Old Irish in, ind from Proto-Celtic *sindos, *sindā, etc.), while the -n continues the article fused with the preposition, with the article being repeated sometimes in modern Scottish Gaelic (eg.

 le Iain, leis a' mhinistear – "with Ian, with the minister"
 fo bhròn, fon bhòrd or fon a' bhòrd – "under sorrow, under the table"

Inflected prepositions with personal pronouns 
Prepositions that mark the dative take the conjugated dative forms of the personal pronouns, thus *aig mi "at me" and *le iad "with them" are incorrect. Such prepositions have conjugated forms, like verbs (see Inflected preposition). The following table presents some commonly used paradigms.

Emphatic forms  
Like the personal pronouns, inflected prepositions have emphatic forms derived by adding the following suffixes:

Inflected prepositions with  possessive determiners 
When the preposition an "in" (often found in the combined form ann an) is followed by a possessive determiner, the two words create a combined form. This also occurs with ag, the form  of aig used with verbal nouns, and a+L. As the last elements of these forms are the possessive determiners, the expected mutations occur.

Emphatic forms 
The emphatic forms of inflected prepositions based on possessive determiners follows the emphatic forms of the emphatic suffixes with possessive determiners. That is, the suffix is added to the noun following the possessive determiner rather than to the possessive determiner itself.

References and notes

Full reference citations

See also
 Old Irish

External links
 Gaelic Orthographic Conventions
 Scottish Qualifications Authority (SQA)
 Orthographic Conventions
 The Scottish Gaelic Grammar Wiki

 

Scottish Gaelic language
Celtic grammars